Alfred Smith (20 April 1867 – 9 February 1936) was an Australian rules footballer who played for the St Kilda Football Club in the Victorian Football League (VFL).

References

External links 

1867 births
1936 deaths
Australian rules footballers from Victoria (Australia)
St Kilda Football Club players
People from Melton, Victoria